Events from the year 1245 in Ireland.

Incumbent
Lord: Henry III

Events
 An earthquake destroys the Cathedral of Down which was established by John de Courcy with generous endowments to the Benedictines from Chester in England in 1183.
 William Welwood becomes Lord Chancellor of Ireland
 Maurice Fitzgerald, the Lord Chief Justice of Ireland, is generally credited with the establishment of the medieval European-style town and port of Sligo, building Sligo Castle in 1245.

References